Olawale Adelusimi (born April 1, 1983) is a Nigerian soccer defender who played for Crystal Palace Baltimore in the USSF Second Division.

Career

College and amateur
Adelusimi came from his native Nigeria to the United States in 2002. He played two years of college soccer at Chandler-Gilbert Community College in Arizona, where he was twice selected to the All-ACCAC 1st Team, twice selected to the All-West Region I 1st Team and was a 2004 All-American Honorable Mention Selection. He transferred to Midwestern State University in his junior year, and helped them the Southwest Soccer Conference championship.

During his college years he also played with Thunder Bay Chill in the USL Premier Development League, and was part of the Chill squad which won the 2008 PDL championship title.

Professional
Adelusimi signed with Crystal Palace Baltimore in 2009, and made his professional debut on May 15, 2009 in a game against Western Mass Pioneers.  Crystal Palace Baltimore released him during the 2010 pre-season.

Honors

Thunder Bay Chill
USL Premier Development League Champions (1): 2008

References

External links
Crystal Palace Baltimore player profile

1983 births
Living people
Nigerian footballers
Yoruba sportspeople
Crystal Palace Baltimore players
Thunder Bay Chill players
USL League Two players
USL Second Division players
Nigerian expatriate footballers
Association football defenders
People from Ondo City
Nigerian expatriate sportspeople in the United States